Uzbekistan participated in the 2018 Asian Games in Jakarta and Palembang, Indonesia from 18 August to 2 September 2018. Uzbekistan made its debut at the Asian Games in 1994 Hiroshima, and the best achievement was in 2002 Busan, with the acquisition of 15 gold, 12 silver and 24 bronze medals. At the last edition in Incheon, the country wrapped up its campaign with 45 medals in all - nine gold, 14 silver and 22 bronze.

Medalists

The following Uzbekistan competitors won medals at the Games.

|  style="text-align:left; width:78%; vertical-align:top;"|

|  style="text-align:left; width:22%; vertical-align:top;"|

Competitors 
The following is a list of the number of competitors representing Uzbekistan that participated at the Games:

Demonstration events

Artistic swimming 

FR: Reserved in free routine; RR: Reserved in technical and free routines; TR: Reserved in technical routine.

Athletics

Boxing 

Men

Women

Canoeing

Slalom

Sprint

Qualification legend: QF=Final; QS=Semifinal

Cycling

Road

Track

Pursuit

Omnium

Madison

Diving 

Men

Equestrian 

Jumping

# – indicates that the score of this rider does not count in the team competition, since only the best three results of a team are counted.

Fencing 

Individual

Team

Football 

Uzbekistan competed in the Group B at the men's football event.

Summary

Men's tournament 

Roster

Group B

Round of 16

Quarter-final

Golf 

Uzbekistan entered four men's golfers who competed in the individual and team event. Several national golf associations complained to the Court of Arbitration for Sport that Uzbekistan fielded professional golfers that reserved for amateurs, but the CAS ruled that none of the players were professional.

Men

Gymnastics

Artistic gymnastics

Men
Individual Qualification & Team all-around Final

Women
Individual Qualification & Team all-around Final

Individual

Ju-jitsu 

Men

Women

Judo 

Uzbekistan participated with 13 athletes (7 men's and 6 women's) in the judo competition.

Men

Women

Mixed

Karate 

Uzbekistan participated in the karate competition at the Games with eight athletes (4 men's and 4 women's).

Kurash 

Men

Women

Pencak silat 

Tanding

Rowing 

Men

Sambo

Shooting 

Men

Women

Mixed team

Swimming 

Men

Women

Taekwondo 

Poomsae

Kyorugi

Tennis 

Men

Women

Mixed

Triathlon 

Individual

Mixed relay

Weightlifting

Uzbekistan weightlifter clinched five medals at the Games.
Ruslan Nurudinov who competed in men's −105 kg broke the Asian Games record in clean and jerk by lifting 230 kg, and also in total lifting 421 kg.

Men

Women

Wrestling 

Men's freestyle

Men's Greco-Roman

Women's freestyle

Wushu 

Men's sanda

Women's taolu

References 

Nations at the 2018 Asian Games
2018
Asian Games